László Marton (22 August 1923 – 25 January 1989) was a Hungarian rower. He competed in the men's eight event at the 1952 Summer Olympics.

References

External links
 

1923 births
1989 deaths
Hungarian male rowers
Olympic rowers of Hungary
Rowers at the 1952 Summer Olympics
Sportspeople from Fejér County